Serratifusus harasewychi is a species of sea snail, a marine gastropod mollusk in the family Buccinidae, the true whelks.

Etymology
This species is named to honor Jerry Harasewych from the National Museum of Natural History, Smithsonian Institution, for his contributions the knowledge of columbariform molluscs.

Description
The length of the shell attains 35.3 mm.

Distribution
This marine species occurs off New Caledonia (depth range: 502-516 m).

References

 Fraussen, K.; Hadorn, R. (2003). Six new Buccinidae (Mollusca: Gastropoda) from New Caledonia. Novapex. 4(2-3): 33-50

External links

Buccinidae
Gastropods described in 2003